"I'm a Believer" is a song written by Neil Diamond and recorded by the Monkees in 1966 with the lead vocals by Micky Dolenz. The single, produced by Jeff Barry, hit the number-one spot on the U.S. Billboard Hot 100 chart for the week ending December 31, 1966, and remained there for seven weeks, becoming the last No. 1 hit of 1966 and the biggest-selling single for all of 1967. Billboard ranked the record as the No. 5 song for 1967. While originally published by Screen Gems-Columbia Music (BMI), it is now published by Stonebridge Music/EMI Foray Music (SESAC), with administration passed to Sony/ATV Music Publishing and Universal Music Publishing Group.

The song was No. 1 in the UK Singles Chart for four weeks in January and February 1967 and reached the top spot in numerous countries, including Australia, New Zealand, Canada, and Ireland.

Billboard described the song as 'an easy-go dance mover' that 'will hit with immediate impact'.  Cash Box said the single is a "medium-paced rocker [that] is full of the group's top notch harmonies and is laced with infectious sounds."

The song appeared in four consecutive episodes of the television series The Monkees in December 1966. The Monkees principals later played it for themselves in live appearances, on overseas tours, and at reunion concerts.

History 
Diamond also suggested the song to the Fifth Estate, who recorded it as a 1967 album cut to follow up their hit "Ding-Dong! The Witch Is Dead".

A recording by Diamond, featuring additional lyrics, appears on his 1979 album September Morn. Diamond also performed it in a duet with Linda Ronstadt as part of a medley of his songs on an episode of The Glen Campbell Goodtime Hour in 1970.

Charts
Neil Diamond

Recording
Session guitarist Al Gorgoni (who played on "The Sound of Silence" and later on "Brown Eyed Girl") had worked on Diamond's "Cherry, Cherry" and also contributed to "I'm a Believer". Other personnel on the record include Sal DiTroia on rhythm guitar, Neil Diamond on acoustic guitar, Russ Savakus on bass, George Butcher on piano, Stan Free on Vox Continental organ, George Devens on tambourine, and Buddy Saltzman on drums.

The song is listed at No. 48 on Billboards All Time Top 100. In 2021, it was listed at No. 341 on Rolling Stone's "Top 500 Greatest Songs of All Time"

Personnel
The Monkees
 Micky Dolenz – lead and backing vocals
 Davy Jones and Peter Tork – backing vocals
Additional Personnel
 Al Gorgoni, Sal DiTroia – electric guitars
 Neil Diamond – acoustic guitar
 Stan Free – organ
 George Butcher – electric piano
 George Devens – tambourine
 Russ Savakus – bass
 Buddy Saltzman – drums
 Jeff Barry – producer
 Artie Butler – arranger

Charts

Weekly charts

Year-end charts

All-time charts

Certifications

Smash Mouth version

American pop rock band Smash Mouth covered the song in 2001 as part of the soundtrack to the movie Shrek, along with "All Star". The band also released the song on its self-titled album. Eddie Murphy, portraying the character Donkey, also performed a rendition of the song in the film. The song was chosen for its opening line, "I thought love was only true in fairy tales", which matched the fairy tale theme of the film. Subsequently, the song was played as exit music for the Broadway musical adaptation of the film, for comic effect. (Weezer also had a version of the song at the end of Shreks 2010 sequel Shrek Forever After, which was inserted into the musical's finale a year into its run.) The Smash Mouth version hit No. 25 on the Billboard Hot 100 and reached the top 20 in New Zealand and Spain. In Australia, the cover reached No. 9 on the ARIA Singles Chart, received a Platinum certification for sales exceeding 70,000, and came in at number 36 on ARIA's year-end chart for 2001.

Music video
The music video for Smash Mouth's version was directed by Scott Marshall. It at first depicts the band performing in a tent; then, the scene switches to them walking out of a movie theater, complete with cardboard advertisements of Shrek and the characters. Then, lead vocalist Steve Harwell bumps into a blond-haired girl by accident and then tries to catch up with her. However, a man with blond hair comes up as Harwell freaks out and screams. Afterwards, the girl walks into a "fairy tale convention" at a hotel. Harwell continues to follow the girl into the hotel. Once in the hotel, Harwell tries to find the girl by looking through different rooms. However, there are short clips from  Shrek each time he opens the door. Finally, he tries one more door and thinks it is the girl. However, it is a blond-haired chimpanzee, who dances with a girl dressed as a banana. With no luck, Harwell walks out of the hotel, but the girl speeds off in her red convertible. Hoping to catch up, he sneakily takes a red jacket and borrows a silver Lexus car driven by a costumed gingerbread man who is injured on crutches. Then, Harwell winks at the camera as the chase begins. While driving, he throws the jacket up and into the street. He then stops at a party where the girl is and goes into a tent (the same tent where the band's performance takes place). However, he sees multiple blond-haired girls with the same red shirt on, all dancing. By the time he catches up to her, the girl goes on a boat. Harwell asks a boat captain for assistance to win the girl. The band then performs on the boat during a heavy storm. Meanwhile, Harwell and the captain are on the lookout of the girl. He finally catches her on a dock and says that she forgot her keys. Just as he is about to leave, the girl recognizes him as Steve from Smash Mouth and asks for his number. However, Harwell declines and says he has to go. Finally, the girl then chases him and yells, "Wait! Please! But I love you!"

Charts and certifications

Weekly charts

Year-end charts

Certifications

Other covers and later uses
British Canterbury scene musician Robert Wyatt issued a cover version of the song as a single on the Virgin Records label in 1974. The record was produced by Pink Floyd drummer Nick Mason and hit #29 on the UK Singles Chart. Wyatt performed the song on BBC's Top of the Pops in September of that year.

The song was originally used in the home video version of the Coen brothers' 1984 film Blood Simple, but after licensing issues were settled, was replaced in the 2001 director's cut of the film by the song used in the theatrical version: Four Tops' "It's the Same Old Song".

An Italian cover by Caterina Caselli, "" ("I'm a liar"), was released in 1967. It was used in Ridley Scott's 2021 biopic House of Gucci.

The song was also covered by EMF with Vic and Bob (Vic Reeves and Bob Mortimer) in 1995 and reached No. 3 in the UK charts.

References

1966 singles
1967 singles
1995 singles
2001 singles
Billboard Hot 100 number-one singles
Cashbox number-one singles
UK Singles Chart number-one singles
Number-one singles in Germany
Number-one singles in Norway
Irish Singles Chart number-one singles
Number-one singles in South Africa
Neil Diamond songs
Robert Wyatt songs
Eddie Murphy songs
Smash Mouth songs
Songs written by Neil Diamond
The Monkees songs
RPM Top Singles number-one singles
Song recordings produced by Eric Valentine
1966 songs
Interscope Records singles
EMF (band) songs
Weezer songs